This is a list of the National Register of Historic Places listings in Teton County, Wyoming.

This is intended to be a complete list of the properties and districts on the National Register of Historic Places in Teton County, Wyoming, United States.

There are 62 properties and districts listed on the National Register in the county, 5 of which are National Historic Landmarks. Another property was once listed on the Register but has been removed.

Current listings

|}

Former listings

|}

See also 

 List of National Historic Landmarks in Wyoming
 National Register of Historic Places listings in Wyoming

References 

 01
Teton
.01